Mick Kennedy may refer to:
 Mick Kennedy (1961–2019), English footballer
 Mick Kennedy (Limerick hurler) (1911–1977)
 Mick Kennedy (Offaly hurler), active 1975-1981
 Mick Kennedy (Gaelic footballer) (born 1958), Irish Gaelic footballer

See also 
 Michael Kennedy (disambiguation)